Punjabi nationalism or Punjabiyat is a vision that emphasizes that Punjabis are one nation and promotes the cultural unity of Punjabis around the world. The demands of the Punjabi nationalist movement are linguistic, cultural, economic and political rights. Baba Farid Ganjshakar is considered as the Father of Punjabi nationalism. Baba Bulleh Shah (wrote Kafis), Waris Shah (wrote Heer Ranjha) and Bhai Vir Singh (Modern Punjabi Literature) have immense contribution to Punjabi Boli. Punjabiyat (meaning Punjabi-ness) or Punjabi nationalism is the name of a cultural and language revitalization movement of the Punjabi language. It also focuses on the political, social and literary movement for preservation of Punjabi literature, Punjabi language and Punjabi culture by unity of Greater Punjab. In Pakistan, the goal of the movement is to stop the state-sponsored suppression of Punjabi in favor of Urdu, while in India the goal is to bring together the Sikh and Punjabi Hindu communities and promote the Punjabi language in regions of Northern India. Supporters in the Punjabi diaspora focus on the promotion of a shared cultural heritage.

Rise of Punjabi Nationalism
The act of uniting by natural affinity and attraction of the various tribes, castes and the inhabitants of the Punjab into a broader common "Punjabi" identity with grooming of "Punjabi nationalism" started from the onset of the 18th century, when the "Sikh Empire with Secular Punjabi Rule" was established by the Maharaja Ranjit Singh. Prior to that the sense and perception of a common "Punjabi" ethnocultural identity and community did not exist, even though the majority of the various communities of the Punjab had long shared linguistic, cultural and racial commonalities.

Actually, after capturing and conquering the Punjab by the Mahmud Ghaznavi in 1022 after defeating the Raja Tarnochalpal, from centuries, Punjab was under continuous attack by the foreign Non Punjabi invaders. Before invasions of Ahmad Shah Durrani, the Mughals were the invaders of Punjab. Punjabi tribes, castes and the inhabitants of Punjab revolted against them, but in a personal capacity and without uniting by the natural affinity of Punjabi people. However, Punjabi Sufi Saints were in a struggle to awaken the consciousness of the people of Punjab. Guru Nanak condemned the theocracy of Mughal rulers and was arrested for challenging the acts of barbarity of the Mughal emperor Babar. Shah Hussain approved Dulla Bhatti's revolt against Akbar as; Kahay Hussain Faqeer Sain Da - Takht Na Milday Mungay.

During the late 18th century, due to lacking in unity by the natural affinity of the various tribes, castes and the inhabitants of the Punjab into a broader common "Punjabi" identity, after the decline of the Mughal Empire, led the Punjab region into a lack of governance. In 1747, the Durrani Empire was established by the Ahmad Shah Abdali in Afghanistan, therefore, Punjab saw frequent invasions by the Ahmad Shah Abdali. The great Punjabi poet Baba Waris Shah said of the barbaric and brutal situation that; "Khada Peeta Lahy Da, Baqi Ahmad Shahy Da" ("We Have Nothing With Us Except What We Eat And Wear, All Other Things Are For Ahmad Shah").

In the result of spiritual grooming and moral character building of Punjabi people by the Punjabi Saints and Punjabi poets like; Baba Farid - 12th-13th century, Damodar - 15th century, Guru Nanak Dev -15th - 16th century, Guru Angad - 16th century, Guru Amar Das - 15th - 16th century, Guru Ram Das - 16th century, Shah Hussain - 16th century, Guru Arjun Dev - 16th - 17th century, Bhai Gurdas - 16th - 17th century, Sultan Bahu - 16th-17th century, Guru Tegh Bahadur - 17th century, Guru Gobind Singh - 17th century, Saleh Muhammad Safoori - 17th century, Bulleh Shah - 17th-18th century, Waris Shah - 18th century and due to frequent invasions by the foreign invaders, at last, by the Ahmad Shah Abdali, stimulated the natural affinity of Punjabi people, taught the lesson to the various tribes, castes and the inhabitants of the Punjab and forced them to unite into a broader common "Punjabi" identity. Therefore, Punjabi nationalism started to initiate in the people of the land of five rivers to defend their land, to protect their wealth, to save their culture and retain their respect by ruling their land and governing the people of their nation by their own self.

In the late 18th century, during frequent invasions of the Durrani Empire, the Sikh Misls were in close combat with the Durrani Empire, but they began to gain territory and eventually the Bhangi Misl captured the Lahore. When Zaman Shah invaded Punjab again in 1799, Maharaja Ranjit Singh was able to make gains in the chaos. He defeated Zaman Shah in a battle between Lahore and Amritsar. Lahore was a Muslim Punjabi community and Hindu Punjabi community majority city, but the citizens of Lahore encouraged by Sada Kaur offered him the city and Maharaja Ranjit Singh was able to take control of it in a series of battles with the Bhangi Misl and their allies.

Beside the fact that, in 1800 century, religious ratio of Punjabi people in Punjab was 48% Muslim Punjabis, 43% Hindu Punjabis, 8% Sikh Punjabis and 1% others, but due to attraction of the various tribes, castes and the inhabitants of the Punjab into a broader common "Punjabi" identity and uniting by natural affinity of "Punjabi Nationalism", Punjab was a secular regime, Punjabi was a secular nation and after throwing out the Muslim Mughal invaders of Punjab from Delhi, India and Muslim Afghan invaders of Punjab from Kabul, Afghanistan, a Sikh Punjabi, Maharaja Ranjit Singh was the ruler of Punjab, which provided the boost to the already initiated Punjabi nationalism.

Fall of Punjabi Nationalism

Maharaja Ranjit Singh made Lahore his capital and expanded the Sikh Empire to the Khyber Pass and also included Jammu and Kashmir in it. He was also successful in keeping the British from expanding across the River Sutlej for more than 40 years. After his death in 1839, internal instability and a sequence of adverse events led eventually to British control of the Lahore Darbar in 1849. The instability and events that led to this were: the internecine fighting between the Sikhs; several rapid forfeitures of territory by his sons; the intrigues of the Dogras; and two Anglo-Sikh wars, the first in 1845–1846 and the second, of 1848-1849.

As, after Bengali nation and Hindi-Urdu Speaking UP, CP people of Gunga Jumna culture, Punjabi was the third biggest nation in South Asia and for the British, Punjab was a frontier province of British India because, Punjab had boundaries with Afghanistan and China. Therefore, to rule the South Asia, the prime factor for the British rulers was to control the Punjab by dominating or eliminating the Punjabi nation.

British rulers were well aware of the fact that, they succeeded to capture the Punjab but they has not concurred the Punjabi nation. Therefore, British rulers imposed martial law in Punjab to govern Punjab and due to a fear from Punjabi nationalism; British rulers started to eliminate the Punjabi nation into fractions by switching over the characteristics of Muslim Punjabi, Hindu Punjabi, and Sikh Punjabi from “Affinity of Nation to Emotions of Religion”.

For demolishing the nationalism and promoting the religious fundamentalism in the Punjab, British rulers, not allowed the Punjabis to use their mother tongue as an educational and official language. Therefore, the British rulers first introduced the Urdu as an official language in Punjab and they brought the Urdu-speaking Muslim Mullahs and Hindi-speaking Hindu Pundits from UP, CP to Punjab for the purpose of educational teaching of Punjabi people along with, UP, CP bureaucracy, and establishment for the purpose of Punjab administration.

It resulted in the supremacy of UP-ites and UP-ite mindsets in policy making and decision taking in national affairs and foreign relationship of the Punjabi nation, managed, motivated and sponsored by the British rulers to eliminate the Muslim, Sikh, Hindu and Christian Punjabis into different religions and languages to secure their rule over last captured land and martial race of the subcontinent.

As a result, the Punjabi nation became a socially and politically depressed and deprived nation due to the domination of Urdu-Hindi language, the hegemony of Gunga Jumna culture and the supremacy of UP-ite traditions.

However, despite all the efforts of British rulers to demolish and eliminate the Punjabi nation, due to the struggle of Punjabi nationalists during British rule in India, beside the dissimilarity of religion, because of natural affinity on ground of similar language, culture and tradition, Muslim Punjabi, Hindu Punjabi, Sikh Punjabi and Christian Punjabi were still a nation. Religion was a personal subject for building the moral character and spiritual development for the life of the hereafter. Punjabi nationalism was a subject for the worldly life affairs. Whereas, clans moreover, communities were the institutions for social interaction and charity work. Punjab was a secular region, the Punjabi language was a respectable language, Punjabi culture was an honorable culture and the Punjabi nation was a wealthy nation in the British India.

In the 19th century, due to politics of congress, dominated by the Hindi speaking, UP-ite Hindu leaders of UP, CP, Hindu Punjabi's started to prefer the Hindi language instead of Punjabi by declaring the Hindi as a language of Hindus and started to become clones of Gunga Jumna culture and traditions with the loss of their own Punjabi identity. Later on, Muslim Punjabi's did the same and started to become the clones of Gunga Jumna culture and traditions with the loss of their own Punjabi identity, because of preferring the Urdu language upon Punjabi by declaring the Urdu as a language of Muslims, due to the influence of the Muslim League, dominated by the Urdu speaking, UP-ite Muslim leaders of UP, CP and presence of UP-ite Muslims in Punjab.

As a consequence of preferring Hindi language by Hindu Punjabi's by declaring the Hindi as a language of Hindus and preferring the Urdu language by the Muslim Punjabi's by declaring the Urdu as a language of Muslims, the characteristics of assimilation to accomplish the sociological instinct started to switch over from “ Affinity of Nation to Emotions of Religion” and “A Great Nation of Sub-Continent Got Divided on Ground of Religion with Partition of Punjab and Got Emerged into Muslim and Hindu States, Pakistan and India”.

Hence, it started the fall of Punjabi nation and Punjabi people started to receive the reward of hate and regret from every honorable nation, in addition, the humiliation, loathing, and abuse from Hindi-Urdu speaking persons, too.

This was the punishment of Punjabi's for not respecting their motherland, language, culture, and traditions, due to avoiding, ignoring and rejecting the act of unity by natural affinity and attraction of the various tribes, castes and the inhabitants of the Punjab into a broader common "Punjabi" identity.

Therefore, since the partition of British India, socially and politically, the Punjabi nation is a confused, depressed and deprived nation due to "Dilemma of Division of Punjab and Punjabi Nation", "Trauma of Massacre of 2 Million Punjabis" and " Shock of World Largest Mass Migration".

Revival of Punjabi Nationalism in Pakistan

After the division of British India with the creation of Pakistan, the Muslim Punjabi community of undivided Punjabi opted Pakistan as their nation, whereas, the ethnically Punjabi Hindus and Sikhs of undivided Punjabi opted India as their nation.

Pakistani Muslim Punjabis are the majority population of Pakistan and they have significant share in the agricultural sector, trade sector, industrial sector, educational institutions, skilled professions, media organizations, political organizations, civil bureaucracy, the military establishment and foreign affair institutions of Pakistan. However, since the creation of Pakistan, Pakistani Muslim Punjabis have felt uncomfortable and upset due to the insulting attitude and behavior with Pakistani Muslim Punjabis regarding social respect and regard of Punjabi people by the non-Punjabi Muslims, victimization with the Punjabis in Sind, Karachi, Baluchistan and Khyber Pakhtunkhwa, hurdles in socioeconomic stability of the Pakistani Muslim Punjabi community in Pakistan, conspiracies in the prosperity and integrity of Punjab by the non-Punjabi Muslims of Pakistan.

Many times, Punjabi nationalists tried to gather and unite the Pakistani Muslim Punjabis for the struggle to achieve the goal of social respect and regard of Punjabi people, for fair treatment with the Pakistani Muslim Punjabis in Sind, Karachi, Baluchistan and Khyber Pakhtunkhwa, to remove the obstacles in socioeconomic stability of Pakistani Muslim Punjabis, to counter the conspiracies in prosperity and integrity of Punjab. However, the effort of uniting Pakistani Muslim Punjabis without stimulating awareness of their Punjabi identity in Punjabi masses and without providing them the consciousness of their Punjabi ideology, the effort of Punjabi nationalists always remained frail, fruitless and useless.

However, now it seems that Punjabi nationalists are succeeded in stimulating awareness of Punjabi identity in Pakistani Muslim Punjabi masses, therefore, now Punjabi nationalists are in the struggle to promote Punjabi language, culture, and traditions, along with, demand from Government of Punjab to implement Punjabi as an educational and official language of Punjab. But, it is an initial stage.

After division of British India with creation of Pakistan, the Christian Punjabi community of Punjabi nation also opted the Pakistan as their state, therefore, revival of Punjabi nationalism in the biggest religious community in Punjabi nation, i.e.; Muslim Punjabi community of Punjabi nation will directly benefit the Christian Punjabi community of Punjabi nation due to creation of atmosphere and circumstances to accelerate the respectable social, economic and political interaction of Punjabi Muslims with the Punjabi Christians because, both the communities are part of same nation.

The Pakistani Muslim Punjabi community of Punjabi nation and Christian Punjabi community of Punjabi nation are the 60% population of Pakistan and Punjabis has total control on the agricultural sector, trade sector, industrial sector, educational institutions, skilled professions, media organizations, political organizations, civil bureaucracy, military establishment and foreign affair institutions of Pakistan.

Post-partition of India

In 1947 after Partition of Punjab into Indian Punjab state and Pakistani Punjab province there were some several movements for protection of Punjabiyat in both Punjabs.

Punjabi Suba movement of East Punjab fulfilled

During the partition of Punjab The Sikhs were promised an autonomous state under Muhammad Ali Jinnah but Jawahar Lal Nehru and Mahatma Gandhi fearing that the Sikhs would join Pakistan promised Sikhs an autonomous state as well. 

Punjabi Suba movement was aimed at creation of a Punjabi-majority subah ("province") in the Punjab region of India in the 1950s. Objectives of this movement and aspirations of Punjabi people were met when this resulted in the creation of Punjab, India as a Punjabi-speaking ethnically Punjabi majority state of India in 1967.

Ongoing Punjabi Language Movement in West Punjab
In Pakistani Punjab province, Punjabi Language Movement is a linguistic movement in aimed at reviving the Punjabi language, art, culture and literature in Pakistan. There are several attempts going on by Punjabi society for implementation of Punjabi language as it is completely ignored by authorities in Punjab province. Urdu is preferred medium of education in local schools-colleges as well as Government paperwork which is threatening for survival of Punjabi language in Punjab, Pakistan. In September 2015, a case was filed in Supreme Court of Pakistan against Government of Punjab, Pakistan as it did not take any step to implement Punjabi language in the province. Pakistani Punjabi language film industry is in crisis as filmmakers were not producing Punjabi language films like before 1975 Punjabi films ruled in film industry of Pakistan. Television Channels from Lahore (Punjab's capital city) are all in Urdu instead of Punjabi. In August 2015, Pakistan Academy of Letters, International Writer's Council (IWC) and World Punjabi Congress (WPC) organised Khawaja Farid conference and demanded Punjabi University should be established in Lahore and Punjabi language should be declared as the medium of instruction at the primary level. In Lahore, every year thousands of punjabis gather on International Mother Language Day demanding education in Punjabi and protesting against the Urdu-isation of Punjab.

Pan-nationalist Punjabi Reunification

The idea of the reunification of modern Indian states of Punjab, Haryana, and Himachal Pradesh into a single Punjab state within India, with its borders corresponding to the former East Punjab state, has not been contemplated seriously apart from the context of reunification of India with Pakistan (consequently, reunification of East and West Punjab.).

See also
Punjabi culture
Punjabi Culture Day
Punjabi festivals
Punjabi Language Movement (Pakistan)
Punjabi Suba movement (India)
Punjabi Wikipedia

References

Punjabi culture
Punjabi language
Punjabi nationalism
Punjab, Pakistan
Punjab, India
Pan-nationalism
Nationalism in Pakistan